SS Hopelyn was a merchant ship from Newcastle that became stranded and then wrecked on Scroby Sands of the Norfolk coast on 17 October 1922.

History
Hopelyn was a merchant steamship which was built in 1918 at Swan Hunter & Wigham Richardson Ltd Sunderland, England with the Yard Number 1041. The ship was ordered by the Hopemount Shipping Company Ltd, (a subsidiary of Swan, Hunter Ltd & Wigham Richardson Ltd) and operated by Stamp, Mann and Company shipping mainly coal from Newcastle.

Final voyage
Hopelyn left Newcastle on 17 October 1922 with a cargo of 3,400 tons of coal and a crew of twenty four plus the ship's cat called Tishy, bound for London. As she made her way down the east coast of England she encountered a north-easterly gale. On the morning of 18th the Hopelyn encountered problems when her steering gear broke down. Temporary repairs were made to the steering but the gale had gradually increased making conditions increasingly worse by the hour. The captain decided that it would be safer for his ship and crew to head for the relative safety of Yarmouth roads. Unfortunately the temporary repairs failed and the captain could not control the ship. The strong gale and crashing seas drove the Hopelyn on to the Scroby sands where she became stranded at position .

Mayday
The captain immediately asked the wireless telegraphist to send out a Mayday. This he managed to do, just before the heavy sea caused the wireless mast to be swept away. It was now 9:30 pm and the Hopelyn was breaking up fast. The crew of 24 took shelter in the Bridge but after a short while had to move to the highest point of the ship's superstructure, namely the 12-foot square wireless room.

Lifeboat launched
Following the Mayday being received by the coastguard, the Gorleston Lifeboat Kentwell had been launched. She was only powered by oars and Coxswain Billy Fleming had acquired a tow from the tug George Jewson. The two vessels found conditions at sea difficult with 30 to 40-foot waves. As the lifeboat approached the Hopelyn, coxswain Fleming sent up flares to highlight the ship's position. By now the Hopelyns back was broken and she was beyond any idea of salvage. The crew of the lifeboat were concerned to see that only a small section of the ship was showing above the heavy seas. The crew were also concerned that they could see no sign that the crew were still alive and on board the Hopelyn. Equally coxswain Fleming had no reason to assume that the crew had perished or left the ship. With this in mind, Fleming held his position right through the night. At daybreak Fleming and his crew could still not see or hear any sign of life on the wreck and so coxswain Fleming made the decision to return to shore. Within one hour of the lifeboats return to Gorleston, the coxswain received word from the Caister coastguard that a makeshift flag had been hoisted from the funnel of the Hopelyn.

Adversity
Fleming and his crew once again set out for Scroby sands. The Kentwell had got to one hundred yards of the ship when a large wave had thrown the lifeboat back on to the sands. A second attempt was made with the result that the Kentwell was thrown violently against the hull of the Hopelyn causing serious damage to the lifeboat, so much so that coxswain Fleming had to get his boat clear of the wreck and sands and return to shore. In response to this, the Lowestoft motor lifeboat Agnes Cross was launched with Coxswain Jack Swan at the Helm.
The two lifeboats met at some point between the wreck and Gorleston. Coxswain Fleming, who had now been at sea for close to sixteen hours, transferred on to the Agnes Cross. With the help and guidance of Fleming, the Lowestoft lifeboat now approached the Hopelyn as darkness closed in. After a time the conditions forced the Agnes Cross to return to shore.

Rescue
It was now the morning of 21 October and the Agnes Cross left her home port with a mixture of Lowestoft and Gorleston crewmen. The gale was still blowing strong. Once back at the wreck of the Hopelyn, coxswain Swan manoeuvred his lifeboat alongside the Hopelyn holding it in position with great skill. Quickly the crew of the ship left the wireless room and scrambled down ropes on to the motor lifeboat Agnes Cross. One of the crewmen carefully cradled the ship's black cat Tishy as he boarded the lifeboat. The rescue had taken a total of thirty hours, two lifeboats, one tug but all 23 crewman, the captain and the ship's cat had all been rescued safely.

Awards
For his part in the rescue of the crew of the Hopelyn, coxswain William Fleming was awarded the Royal National Lifeboat Institution Gold Medal as was coxswain John Sterry Swan. Fifteen Bronze Medals were awarded to other lifeboat crewmen.

References

External links
Great Yarmouth and Gorleston Lifeboat
RNLI Great Yarmouth and Gorleston Lifeboat Station

1917 ships
Maritime incidents in 1922
Merchant ships of the United Kingdom
Ships built on the River Wear
Shipwrecks of Norfolk
Shipwrecks in the North Sea
Steamships of the United Kingdom